Henry George Friesen  (born July 31, 1934) is a Canadian endocrinologist, a distinguished professor emeritus of the University of Manitoba and the discoverer of human prolactin, a hormone which stimulates lactation in mammary glands.

Born in Morden, Manitoba, he obtained a Bachelor of Science in medicine and a medical degree from the University of Manitoba in 1958. From 1965 to 1973 he was at McGill University and from 1973 to 1992 he was a professor and head of the department of physiology and professor of medicine at the University of Manitoba.

Dr. Friesen was a recipient of the 1977 Canada Gairdner International Award "In recognition of his contributions to the understanding of the biochemistry, physiology and pathophysiology of lactogenic hormones and, in particular, for the identification of human prolactin."

His research on growth hormones in dwarf children helped in developing a therapy for the treatment of this problem. In addition his work with prolactin helped to develop the drug bromocriptine, used for the treatment of infertility.

From 1991 until 1999 he was president of the Medical Research Council of Canada and helped to transform it into the Canadian Institutes of Health Research. He was president of the National Cancer Institute of Canada and president of the Canadian Society for Clinical Investigation. He is the founding chair of Genome Canada.

Honours
 He was a recipient of the 1977 Canada Gairdner International Award.
 In 1978 he was made a Fellow of the Royal Society of Canada.
 He was named an Officer of the Order of Canada in 1987 and promoted Companion in 2001.
 In 2001 he was inducted into the Canadian Medical Hall of Fame.
 In 2001 he was awarded the Gairdner Foundation Wightman Award.
 In 2004 he was awarded the Order of Manitoba.
 In 2006 he was awarded the Canadian Medical Association's F.N.G. Starr Award, described as the "Victoria Cross of Canadian Medicine", "for his exceptional devotion for the betterment of mankind which has made a difference in health care". 
 He has received Honorary Doctorates from the University of Western Ontario, University of Manitoba, University of British Columbia, McGill University and McMaster University.

References

  
 

1934 births
Living people
Canadian biologists
Canadian medical researchers
Companions of the Order of Canada
Canadian endocrinologists
Fellows of the Royal Society of Canada
Members of the Order of Manitoba
Foreign associates of the National Academy of Sciences
People from Morden, Manitoba
Academic staff of the University of Manitoba
Canadian Mennonites
Members of the National Academy of Medicine